Harry G. Fritz (June 13, 1920 – May 27, 1987) was a collegiate athletics administrator and an American football, basketball, and baseball coach. He served as the head football coach at the University of Central Missouri in Warrensburg, Missouri in 1952.  Fritz was also the head baseball coach at his alma mater, Transylvania University in Lexington, Kentucky from 1947 to 1948.  Before his retirement, he served as the head of the National Association of Intercollegiate Athletics.

Fritz was the father of current Tulane Green Wave football coach Willie Fritz.

Head coaching record

Football

References

External links
 

1920 births
1987 deaths
American men's basketball players
Basketball coaches from Ohio
Basketball players from Ohio
Bemidji State Beavers athletic directors
Bemidji State Beavers men's basketball coaches
Buffalo Bulls athletic directors
Central Missouri Mules football coaches
People from Wheelersburg, Ohio
Players of American football from Ohio
Rio Grande RedStorm men's basketball players
Transylvania Pioneers baseball coaches
Transylvania Pioneers men's basketball coaches
Transylvania Pioneers men's basketball players
Western Illinois Leathernecks athletic directors